Anasigerpes is a genus of praying mantis in the family Acromantinae from Africa.

See also
List of mantis genera and species

References

 
Acromantinae
Mantodea genera
Mantodea of Africa
Taxa named by Ermanno Giglio-Tos